The Guwahati–Dibrugarh Intercity Express is a daily intercity express train which runs between Guwahati railway station in Guwahati, the capital city of Assam, and Dibrugarh railway station of Dibrugarh in upper Assam.

Time table
 From Guwahati to Dibrugarh (15605) – departure from Guwahati (GHY) 19:45 IST; arrival at Dibrugarh (DBRG) 11:30 IST. 
 From Dibrugarh to Guwahati (15606) – departure from Dibrugarh (DBRG) 14:25 IST; arrival at Guwahati (GHY) 05:30 IST.

References

Rail transport in Assam
Intercity Express (Indian Railways) trains
Transport in Guwahati
Transport in Dibrugarh
Transport in Jorhat